Youth Indigenize the Senate is an initiative of the Senate of Canada wherein Canadians nominate Indigenous youth leaders from across Canada to share their ideas and experiences with the Senate Committee on Aboriginal Peoples during an official public hearing, taking place annually in June.

The Senate Committee on Aboriginal Peoples has a history of hearing from the Indigenous youth of Canada. In November 2011, the committee heard the testimony of witnesses from the National Inuit Youth Council, the Assembly of First Nations National Youth Council, and the Métis Nation of Ontario Youth Council on a discussion about issues facing indigenous youth. Since 2016, each June, the Senate Committee on Aboriginal Peoples has brought young Indigenous leaders from across Canada to the Senate—Aboriginal History Month in Canada to share their thoughts and experiences.

The Committee seeks youth feedback on issues plaguing Indigenous communities across Canada, including broken treaties, housing shortages, and economic marginalization. From identifying challenges to sharing success stories, the Committee seeks to provide Indigenous youth a platform where their voices can be heard. Indigenous youth are nominated by people in their community to be part of the program.

In 2021, the hearing took place virtually on June 28.

History

2016 
The first Youth Indigenize the Senate event took place in June 2016. The event brought 12 Indigenous youth leaders to the Senate to testify before the committee. As the inaugural event was focused on celebrating National Aboriginal Day in Canada, the Indigenous youth leaders shared their success stories with the Senate Committee on Aboriginal Peoples.

2017 
In its second installment, on 7 June 2017, Youth Indigenize the Senate had two components: the Indigenous Youth Leaders Program and the Youth Forum. Over the course of their day on Parliament Hill, youth leaders met with Senate leaders and testified before the Senate Committee on Aboriginal Peoples, this time lending their voices to the committee's study on a new relationship between Canada and Indigenous peoples.

The day also featured a youth forum that hosted workshops on reconciliation for more than 50 Indigenous and non-Indigenous youths from the Ottawa area.

2018 
For the third year in a row, the Senate of Canada invited Indigenous youth from across the country to participate in Youth Indigenize the Senate Day on 6 June 2018, on Parliament Hill. 
 
Nine Indigenous youth testified about their experiences as leaders and shared their visions for a new relationship between Canada and First Nations, Inuit, and Métis peoples, which is the focus of an ongoing study by the Senate Committee on Aboriginal Peoples. The group was also given a tour of Parliament Hill and met one-on-one with several senators to discuss issues like education in their communities and protecting Indigenous culture.

2019

References

External links 

 https://sencanada.ca

Ethnic organizations based in Canada
Youth organizations based in Canada
Indigenous organizations in Canada
Senate of Canada
Indigenous politics in Canada